Barfabad-e Olya (also Romanized as Barfābād-e ‘Olyā; also known as Barfābād) is a village in Howmeh-ye Jonubi Rural District, in the Central District of Eslamabad-e Gharb County, Kermanshah Province, Iran. At the 2006 census, its population was 1,343, divided across 304 families.

References 

Populated places in Eslamabad-e Gharb County